Contributive justice "emphasizes that justice is achieved not when benefits are received, but rather when there is both the duty and opportunity for everyone to contribute labor and decision-making."

See also

Notes

References 
 T-Kay Sangwand, “Preservation is Political: Enacting Contributive Justice and Decolonizing Transnational Archival Collaborations,” KULA: Knowledge Creation, Dissemination, and Preservation Studies 2, 1 (2018), https://doi.org/10.5334/kula.36. 

 Paul Gomberg, How to Make Opportunity Equal : Race and Contributive Justice (Blackwell Pub., 2007).
 Jose Antonio Merlo-Vega and Clara M. Chu, “Out of Necessity Comes Unbridled Imagination for Survival: Contributive Justice in Spanish Libraries during Economic Crisis,” Library Trends, 64.2 (Sept. 2015), 299.

Justice